Haralambiev Island is the 530 m long in southeast-northwest direction and 300 m wide rocky island with surface area of  in the Larsen Islands group on the west side of Coronation Island in the South Orkney Islands, Antarctica. It is "named after Captain Hristo Haralambiev (1948–2005), commander of the ocean fishing trawler Aktinia of the Bulgarian company Ocean Fisheries – Burgas during its fishing trip to Antarctic waters off South Georgia and the South Orkney Islands from November 1979 to June 1980. The Bulgarian fishermen, along with those of the Soviet Union, Poland and East Germany are the pioneers of modern Antarctic fishing industry."

Location
British mapping in 1963.

Maps
 British Antarctic Territory: South Orkney Islands. Scale 1:100000 topographic map. DOS Series 510. Surrey, England: Directorate of Overseas Surveys, 1963
 Antarctic Digital Database (ADD). Scale 1:250000 topographic map of Antarctica. Scientific Committee on Antarctic Research (SCAR). Since 1993, regularly upgraded and updated

Notes

References
 Haralambiev Island. SCAR Composite Gazetteer of Antarctica

External links
 Haralambiev Island. Adjusted Copernix satellite image

 

Islands of the South Orkney Islands
Ocean Fisheries – Burgas Co
Bulgaria and the Antarctic